General Mariano Alvarez Technical High School is located in General Mariano Alvarez, Cavite, Philippines.

References

High schools in Cavite